The Clunes Football Netball Club is an Australian rules football and Netball club that are based in the former goldrush town of Clunes, Victoria. The footballers play in the Central Highlands Football League and the netballers play in the Central Highlands Netball League, while both leagues are separate entities they are synchronise with each other for the fixtures and finals.

History 
The club was formed in 1886 and played in various local games up until 1917. Games were often played midweek in the early days with many players being employed in the mines. Football in the town were often formed from the labour of mining companies and commercial merchants. Teams were formed and a local identity would donate a cup or trophy for competition.

Surprisingly for a club of its age it never was in a structured association until after World War 1. In 1919 Creswick District Football Association was formed with Clunes being one of the founding clubs. Clunes was unsettled as it twice left the local competition to play in the Maryborough Association. When the Maryborough competition failed to operate in 1931 Clunes had to come up with a solution. 

In 1931 the Clunes Football Association was formed and Clunes was a founding club. Three other clubs were Smeaton, Newstead and Campbelltown. Runners up in the inaugural year it took a few more years before Clunes won its first Premiership in 1934.

As the lad was boarding and attended at Ballarat College.

Clunes was a dominating force during the fifties and sixties, as they made the Grand Final in thirteen of eighteen seasons but for only five wins. Their main competitor was Bungaree who meet them in seven Grand Finals during the sixties.
Clunes would remain in the Clunes league until it merged with the Ballarat and Bacchus Marsh Football League to form the Central Highlands Football League, with Clunes among the new competition's fifteen founder members.

In Clunes Football Association last season in 1978, it was one of the most climatic in its history as Clunes and Newlyn played out the competition's only ever grand final draw with Clunes 9.15.69 to Newlyn 10.9.69. Clunes won the replay 20.5.125 to Newlyn  7.11.53.

Success again the following year in the new competition with Clunes defeating Ballan 11.13.79 to 11.10.76.

Their two other premierships were in 1993 when they again defeated Ballan 14.14.98 to 12.12.84 and in 1997 when they defeated Dunnstown 13.17.95 to 12.16.88.
Current AFL player Nick Hind grew up in Clunes and played 49 Senior games for the Clunes Football Netball Club and winning the 2014 Club Best and Fairest. Nick is currently with the Essendon Bombers where he was drafted in 2021 after playing 21 games for the St Kilda Saints in 2019–2020. Nick Hind

Club jumper 
 In 1919, the club adopted the Collingwood colours of black and white vertical stripes.
 In 1931, the stripe was changed to black with a white stripe down the middle.
 In 1933, this was reversed back to white with a black stripe down the middle.
 1945 saw the club sporting a black jumper with white collar and cuffs with a CFC monogram.
 In 1973, the club reverted to the Collingwood stripes.
 In 1979, the club switched to white with a black stripe down the middle.
 In 1982, the club switched to black with a white V yolk.
 In 1987, the club again switched back to the Collingwood stripes.

Senior premierships 
 Clunes Football League
1934, 1951, 1953, 1958, 1960, 1963, 1978, 
 Central Highlands Football League
 1979, 1993 and 1997

AFL/VFL players 
 Bob Davis -  
 Graham Donaldson - 
 Nick Hind -  /

Book
History of Football in the Ballarat District  by John Stoward -

References

External links
 Club profile on Clunes website
 

Australian rules football clubs in Victoria (Australia)
Netball teams in Victoria (Australia)
Australian rules football clubs established in 1886
1886 establishments in Australia